Gedling is a constituency in Nottinghamshire created in 1983 represented in the House of Commons of the UK Parliament since 2019 by Tom Randall of the Conservative Party. The seat (and its predecessor, Carlton) was a safely Conservative until the Labour Party's landslide victory in 1997, when it was won for Labour by Vernon Coaker. Labour held Gedling until 2019, when it was regained by the Conservative Party.

Boundaries and profile

1983–2010: The Borough of Gedling wards of Bonington, Burton Joyce and Stoke Bardolph, Carlton, Carlton Hill, Cavendish, Conway, Gedling, Killisick, Kingswell, Mapperley Plains, Netherfield, Oxclose, Phoenix, Porchester, Priory, St James, St Mary's, and Woodthorpe.

2010–present: The Borough of Gedling wards of Bonington, Burton Joyce and Stoke Bardolph, Carlton, Carlton Hill, Daybrook, Gedling, Killisick, Kingswell, Mapperley Plains, Netherfield and Colwick, Phoenix, Porchester, St James, St Mary's, Valley, and Woodthorpe.

Gedling is a substantial part of Greater Nottingham covering the most populated parts of the borough of the same name; it has mainly affluent, middle-income north eastern suburbs of Nottingham that include Arnold, Burton Joyce, Carlton, Colwick and Gedling village, Woodthorpe and Mapperley Plains.

History
The constituency of Gedling was created in 1983, replacing the earlier Carlton constituency. Until 1997, it only elected candidates from the Conservative Party. The seat was represented by the former Carlton MP Sir Philip Holland until 1987, then for ten years by Andrew Mitchell, son of former Conservative MP David Mitchell. The Labour Party gained the seat in their landslide victory at the 1997 general election. At that election, the junior minister lost to Labour's Vernon Coaker, who retained the seat until the 2019 election.

Summary of results
The 2010 and 2015 results set the seat as marginal: first and second place were separated by less than 7%. At the 2005 general election, the Conservative candidate Anna Soubry (who was elected MP for nearby Broxtowe in 2010) caused controversy by revealing that she "was not proud" of the record of the area she was vying to represent, referring to crime levels in Nottingham — the subsequent swing from Labour to Conservative was only 2.1%, compared with the national swing of 3.1%. The 2015 result gave the seat the 29th-smallest majority of Labour's 232 seats by percentage of majority.

Other parties
In 2015, UKIP fielded the other candidate to retain their deposit. The party's swing nationally was +9.5% in 2015, and reached 11.4% in Gedling. Liberal Democrat and Green Party candidates forfeited their deposits in 2015.

Turnout
Turnout has varied from 82.3% of the vote in 1992 to 63.9% in 2001 and 2005.

Members of Parliament

Elections

Elections in the 2010s

Because of boundary changes, vote shares in 2010 are compared to notional results from 2005.

Elections in the 2000s

Elections in the 1990s

Elections in the 1980s

See also
List of parliamentary constituencies in Nottinghamshire

Notes

References

Parliamentary constituencies in Nottinghamshire
Constituencies of the Parliament of the United Kingdom established in 1983